{{DISPLAYTITLE:5-HT2A receptor}}

The 5-HT2A receptor is a subtype of the 5-HT2 receptor that belongs to the serotonin receptor family and is a G protein-coupled receptor (GPCR). The 5-HT2A receptor is a cell surface receptor, but has several intracellular locations. 5-HT is short for 5-hydroxy-tryptamine or serotonin. This is the main excitatory receptor subtype among the GPCRs for serotonin, although 5-HT2A may also have an inhibitory effect on certain areas such as the visual cortex and the orbitofrontal cortex. This receptor was first noted for its importance as a target of serotonergic psychedelic drugs such as LSD and psilocybin mushrooms. Later it came back to prominence because it was also found to be mediating, at least partly, the action of many antipsychotic drugs, especially the atypical ones.

Downregulation of post-synaptic 5-HT2A receptor is an adaptive process provoked by chronic administration of selective serotonin reuptake inhibitors (SSRIs) and atypical antipsychotics. Suicidal and otherwise depressed patients have had more 5-HT2A receptors than normal patients. These findings suggest that post-synaptic 5-HT2A overdensity is involved in the pathogenesis of depression.

Paradoxical down-regulation of 5-HT2A receptors can be observed with several 5-HT2A antagonists. Thus, instead of tolerance, reverse-tolerance would be expected from 5-HT2A antagonists. However, there is at least one antagonist at this site which has been shown to up-regulate 5-HT2A receptors. Additionally, a couple of other antagonists may have no effect on 5-HT2A receptor number. Nevertheless, upregulation is the exception rather than the rule. Neither tolerance nor rebound is observed in humans with regard to the slow-wave sleep(SWS) promoting effects of 5-HT2A antagonists.

History 
5-HT receptors were split into two classes by John Gaddum and Picarelli when it was discovered that some of the serotonin-induced changes in the gut could be blocked by morphine, while the remainder of the response was inhibited by dibenzyline, leading to the naming of M and D receptors, respectively. 5-HT2A is thought to correspond to what was originally described as D subtype of 5-HT receptors by Gaddum and Picarelli. In the era before molecular cloning, when radioligand binding and displacement was the only major tool, spiperone and LSD were shown to label two different 5-HT receptors, and neither of them displaced morphine, leading to naming of the 5-HT1, 5-HT2 and 5-HT3 receptors, corresponding to high affinity sites from LSD, spiperone and morphine, respectively. Later it was shown that the 5-HT2 was very close to 5-HT1C and thus were grouped together, renaming the 5-HT2 into 5-HT2A. Thus, the 5-HT2 receptor family is composed of three separate molecular entities: the 5-HT2A (formerly known as 5-HT2 or D), the 5-HT2B (formerly known as 5-HT2F) and the 5-HT2C (formerly known as 5-HT1C) receptors.

Distribution 
5-HT2A is expressed widely throughout the central nervous system (CNS).
It is expressed near most of the serotonergic terminal rich areas, including neocortex (mainly prefrontal, parietal, and somatosensory cortex) and the olfactory tubercle. Especially high concentrations of this receptor on the apical dendrites of pyramidal cells in layer V of the cortex may modulate cognitive processes, working memory, and attention by enhancing glutamate release followed by a complex range of interactions with the 5-HT1A, GABAA, adenosine A1, AMPA, mGluR2/3, mGlu5, and OX2 receptors. In the rat cerebellum, the protein has also been found in the Golgi cells of the granular layer, and in the Purkinje cells.

In the periphery, it is highly expressed in platelets and many cell types of the cardiovascular system, in fibroblasts, and in neurons of the peripheral nervous system. Additionally, 5-HT2A mRNA expression has been observed in human monocytes. Whole-body distribution of the 5-HT2A/2C receptor agonist, [11C]Cimbi-36 show uptake in several internal organs and brown adipose tissue (BAT), but it is not clear if this represents specific 5-HT2A receptor binding.

Signaling cascade 
The 5-HT2A receptor is known primarily to couple to the Gαq signal transduction pathway. Upon receptor stimulation with agonist, Gαq and β-γ subunits dissociate to initiate downstream effector pathways.  Gαq stimulates phospholipase C (PLC) activity, which subsequently promotes the release of diacylglycerol (DAG) and inositol triphosphate (IP3), which in turn stimulate protein kinase C (PKC) activity and Ca2+ release.

Effects 
Physiological processes mediated by the receptor include:
 CNS: neuronal excitation, hallucinations, out-of-body experiences, and fear. Primarily responsible for the psychedelic effects associated with 5-HT2A receptor agonists such as LSD, DMT, etc.
 Activation of the 5-HT2A receptor with 2,5-dimethoxy-4-iodoamphetamine (DOI) produces potent anti-inflammatory effects in several tissues including cardiovascular and gut. Other 5-HT2A agonists like LSD also have potent anti-inflammatory effects against TNF-alpha-induced inflammation.
 Activation of the 5-HT2A receptor in hypothalamus causes increases in hormonal levels of oxytocin, prolactin, ACTH, corticosterone, and renin.
 Role in memory and learning
 Role in arthralgia.
 Role in Alzheimer's disease.
 Smooth muscle contraction in the gut.
 Probable role in sleep paralysis.

Ligands

Agonists 
Activation of the 5-HT2A receptor is necessary for the effects of the "classic" psychedelics like LSD, psilocin and mescaline, which act as full or partial agonists at this receptor, and represent the three main classes of 5-HT2A agonists, the ergolines, tryptamines and phenethylamines, respectively. A very large family of derivatives from these three classes has been developed, and their structure-activity relationships have been extensively researched. Agonists acting at 5-HT2A receptors located on the apical dendrites of pyramidal cells within regions of the prefrontal cortex are believed to mediate hallucinogenic activity. Some findings reveal that psychoactive effects of classic psychedelics are mediated by the receptor heterodimer 5-HT2A–mGlu2 and not by monomeric 5-HT2A receptors. However, newer research suggests that 5HT2A and mGlu2 receptors do not physically associate with each other, so the former findings have questionable relevance. Agonists enhance dopamine in PFC, enhance memory and play an active role in attention and learning.

Full agonists 
25I-NBOH and its 2-methoxy-analog 25I-NBOMe
 18F FECIMBI-36, radiolabelled agonist ligand for mapping 5-HT2A / 5-HT2C receptor distribution
 TCB-2
 Mexamine is a full agonist to several serotonin receptors.
 O-4310, 5-HT2A selective, claimed to have 100x selectivity over 5-HT2C and be inactive at 5-HT2B
 PHA-57378, dual 5-HT2A / 5-HT2C agonist, anxiolytic effects in animal studies.
 25B-NBOMe Also known as Cimbi-36; used as a PET imaging tool for visualizing the 5-HT2A receptor

Partial agonists 
 25C-NBOMe
 25CN-NBOH, 100x selectivity for 5-HT2A over 5-HT2C, 46x selectivity over 5-HT2B.
 AAZ-A-154, non-hallucinogenic but retains antidepressant effects in animals.
 Bromo-DragonFLY
 (R)-DOI, traditionally the most common 5-HT2A reference agonist used in research
 Efavirenz, an antiretroviral drug, produces psychiatric side effects thought to be mediated by 5-HT2A.
 DMBMPP, a structurally constrained derivative of 25B-NBOMe, which acts as a potent partial agonist with 124x selectivity for 5-HT2A over 5-HT2C, making it the most selective agonist ligand identified to date.
 Lisuride, an antiparkinson dopamine agonist of the ergoline class, that is also a dual 5-HT2A / 5-HT2C agonist and 5-HT2B antagonist.
 Mefloquine, an antimalarial drug, also produces psychiatric side effects which may be mediated through 5-HT2A and/or 5-HT2C receptors.
 Methysergide, a congener of methylergonovine, used in treatment of migraine blocks 5-HT2A and 5-HT2C receptors, but sometimes acts as partial agonist, in some preparations.
 OSU-6162 acts as a partial agonist at both 5-HT2A and dopamine D2 receptors
 Quipazine, 5-HT2A agonist but also potent 5-HT3 agonist.
 SN-22, partial agonist at all three 5-HT2 subtypes
 3-carboxy indole PB-22 (1-pentyl-indole-3-carboxylic acid), a metabolite of the synthetic cannabinoid PB-22, partial agonist at 5-HT2A
 Some benzazepines and similar compounds related to lorcaserin such as SCHEMBL5334361 are potent 5-HT2A agonists as well as showing action at 5-HT2C.
 IHCH-7113, 5-HT2A agonist derived by simplification of the 5-HT2A antagonist antipsychotic lumateperone.
 Tetrahydropyridine derivatives such as (R)-69
 Substituted tetrahydro-β-carbolines

Peripherally selective agonists 
One effect of 5-HT2A receptor activation is a reduction in intraocular pressure, and so 5-HT2A agonists can be useful for the treatment of glaucoma. This has led to the development of compounds such as AL-34662 that are hoped to reduce pressure inside the eyes but without crossing the blood–brain barrier and producing hallucinogenic side effects. Animal studies with this compound showed it to be free of hallucinogenic effects at doses up to 30 mg/kg, although several of its more lipophilic analogues did produce the head-twitch response known to be characteristic of hallucinogenic effects in rodents.

Antagonists 
 Volinanserin is the most potent 5-HT2A antagonist. It is also called MDL100907 or M100907. It underwent a few clinical trials but never got marketed.
 Trazodone is a potent 5-HT2A antagonist, as well as an antagonist on other serotonin receptors.
 Brexpiprazole an atypical antipsychotic, is a potent antagonist at 5-HT2A receptors (Ki=0.47 nM in humans).
 Most tricyclic antidepressants: Amitriptyline, Nortriptyline, Amoxapine, Clomipramine, Doxepin, Maprotiline, Imipramine, Iprindole
 Tetracyclic antidepressants: Mianserin, Mirtazapine, Maprotiline
 Although ergot alkaloids are mostly nonspecific 5-HT receptor antagonists, a few ergot derivatives such as metergoline and nicergoline bind preferentially to members of the 5-HT2 receptor family.
 The discovery of ketanserin was a landmark in the pharmacology of 5-HT2 receptors. Ketanserin, though capable of blocking 5-HT induced platelet adhesion, however does not mediate its well-known antihypertensive action through 5-HT2 receptor family, but through its high affinity for alpha1 adrenergic receptors. It also has high affinity for H1 histaminergic receptors equal to that at 5-HT2A receptors.  Compounds chemically related to ketanserin such as ritanserin are more selective 5-HT2A receptor antagonists with low affinity for alpha-adrenergic receptors. However, ritanserin, like most other 5-HT2A receptor antagonists, also potently inhibits 5-HT2C receptors.
 Nefazodone operates by blocking post-synaptic serotonin type-2A receptors and to a lesser extent by inhibiting pre-synaptic serotonin and norepinephrine (noradrenaline) reuptake.
 Atypical antipsychotic drugs like clozapine, olanzapine, quetiapine, risperidone and asenapine are relatively potent antagonists of 5-HT2A as are some of the lower potency old generation/typical antipsychotics. Another antagonist is cyproheptadine.
 Pizotifen is a non-selective antagonist.
 LY-367,265 - dual 5-HT2A antagonist / SSRI with antidepressant effects
 2-alkyl-4-aryl-tetrahydro-pyrimido-azepines are subtype selective antagonists (35g: 60-fold).
 AMDA and related derivatives are another family of selective 5-HT2A antagonists.
 Typical antipsychotics such as haloperidol and chlorpromazine (minor)
 Opipramol, an atypical antidepressant
 Hydroxyzine (Atarax) (minor effect)
 5-MeO-NBpBrT
 Niaprazine
 Cariprazine
 Nantenine

Antagonists and cardiovascular disease 

Increased 5-HT2A expression is observed in patients with coronary thrombosis, and the receptor has been associated with processes that influence atherosclerosis. As the receptor is present in coronary arteries and capable of mediating vasoconstriction, 5-HT2A has also been linked to coronary artery spasms. 5HT antagonism, therefore, has potential in the prevention of cardiovascular disease, however, no studies have been published so far.

Inverse agonists 
 AC-90179 - potent and selective inverse agonist at 5-HT2A, also 5-HT2C antagonist.
 Nelotanserin (APD-125) - selective 5-HT2A inverse agonist developed by Arena Pharmaceuticals for the treatment of insomnia. APD-125 was shown to be effective and well tolerated in clinical trials.
 Eplivanserin (Sanofi Aventis), a sleeping pill that reached phase II trials (but for which the application for approval was withdrawn), acts as a selective 5-HT2A inverse agonist.
 Pimavanserin (ACP-103) – more selective than AC-90179, orally active, antipsychotic in vivo, now FDA approved for the treatment of hallucinations and delusions associated with Parkinson's disease.

Functional selectivity 
5-HT2A-receptor ligands may differentially activate the transductional pathways (see above). Studies evaluated the activation of two effectors, PLC and PLA2, by means of their second messengers. Compounds displaying more pronounced functional selectivity are 2,5-DMA and 2C-N. The former induces IP accumulation without activating the PLA2 mediated response, while the latter elicits AA release without activating the PLC mediated response.

Recent research has suggested potential signaling differences within the somatosensory cortex between 5-HT2A agonists that produce headshakes in the mouse and those that do not, such as lisuride, as these agents are also non-hallucinogenic in humans despite being active 5-HT2A agonists.
One known example of differences in signal transduction is between the two 5-HT2A agonists serotonin and DOI that involves differential recruitment of intracellular proteins called β-arrestins, more specifically arrestin beta 2. Cyclopropylmethanamine derivatives such as (-)-19 have also been shown to act as 5-HT2A/2C agonists with functional selectivity for Gq-mediated signaling compared with β-arrestin recruitment.

Genetics 

The 5-HT2A receptors is coded by the HTR2A gene.
In humans the gene is located on chromosome 13.
The gene has previously been called just HTR2 until the description of two related genes HTR2B and HTR2C.
Several interesting polymorphisms have been identified for HTR2A:
A-1438G (rs6311),
C102T (rs6313) and
His452Tyr (rs6314).
Many more polymorphisms exist for the gene.
A 2006 paper listed 255.

Probable role in fibromyalgia as the T102C polymorphisms of the gene 5HT2A were common in fibromyalgia patients.

Human HTR2A gene is thought to consist of 3 introns and 4 exons and to overlap with human gene HTR2A-AS1 which consists of 18 exons. There are over 200 organisms that have orthologs with the human HTR2A. Currently, the best documented orthologs for HTR2A gene are the mouse, and zebrafish. There are 8 paralogs for the HTR2A gene. The HTR2A gene is known to interact and activate G-protein genes such as GNA14, GNAI1, GNAI3, GNAQ , and GNAZ. These interactions are critical for cell signaling and homeostasis  in many organisms.

In human brain tissue, regulation of HTR2A varies depending on the region: frontal cortex, amygdala, thalamus, brain stem and cerebellum. In a paper from 2016, they found that HTR2A undergoes a variety of different splicing events, including utilization of alternative splice acceptor sites, exon skipping, rare exon usage, and intron retention.

Mechanisms of regulation 

There are a few mechanisms of regulation for HTR2A gene such regulated by DNA methylation at particular transcript binding sites. Another mechanism for the correct regulation of gene expression is achieved through alternative splicing. This is a co-transcriptional process, which allows the generation of multiple forms of mRNA transcript from a single coding unit and is emerging as an important control point for gene expression. In this process, exons or introns can be either included or excluded from precursor-mRNA resulting in multiple mature mRNA variants. These mRNA variants result in different isoforms which may have antagonistic functions or differential expression patterns, yielding plasticity and adaptability to the cells. One study found that the common genetic variant rs6311 regulates expression of HTR2A transcripts containing the extended 5' UTR.

Associations with psychiatric disorders 
Several studies have seen links between the -1438G/A polymorphism and mood disorders, such as bipolar disorder
and major depressive disorder.
A weak link with an odds ratio of 1.3 has been found between the T102C polymorphism and schizophrenia.
This polymorphism has also been studied in relation to suicide attempts, with a study finding excess of the C/C genotypes among the suicide attempters. A number of other studies were devoted to finding an association of the gene with schizophrenia, with diverging results.

These individual studies may, however, not give a full picture: A review from 2007 looking at the effect of different SNPs reported in separate studies stated that "genetic association studies [of HTR2A gene variants with psychiatric disorders] report conflicting and generally negative results" with no involvement, small or a not replicated role for the genetic variant of the gene.

Polymorphisms in the promoter gene coding Early growth response 3 (EGR3) are associated with schizophrenia. Studies have demonstrated a relationship between EGR3 and HTR2A, and schizophrenia-like behaviors in transgenic animals. Exactly how these results translate over to further biopsychological understanding of schizophrenia is still widely debated. There is some evidence that dysfunction of HTR2A can impact pharmacological interventions.

Several studies have assessed a relationship between 5-hydroxytryptamine (serotonin) 2A receptor (5-HTR2A) gene polymorphisms with an increased risk of suicidal behavior. One study revealed that T102C polymorphism is associated with suicidal behavior  but other studies failed to replicate these findings and found no association between polymorphism and suicidal behavior.

Treatment response 
Genetics seems also to be associated to some extent with the amount of adverse events in treatment of major depression disorder.

Associations with substance abuse 

Polymorphisms in the 5-HT2A receptor coding gene HTR2A (rs6313 and s6311) have been shown to have conflicting associations with alcohol misuse. For example, A polymorphism in the 5-HT2A receptor coding gene HTR2A (rs6313) was reported to predict lower positive alcohol expectancy, higher refusal self-efficacy, and lower alcohol misuse in a sample of 120 young adults. However, this polymorphism did not moderate the linkages between impulsivity, cognition, and alcohol misuse. There are conflicting results as other studies have found associations between T102C polymorphisms alcohol misuse.

Drug impact on gene expression 

There is some evidence that methylation patterns may contribute to relapse behaviors in people who use stimulants. In mice, psychotropic drugs such as DOI, LSD, DOM, and DOB which produced differing transcriptional patterns among several different brain regions.

Methods to analyse the receptor
The receptor can be analysed by neuroimaging, radioligand, genetic analysis, measurements of ion flows, and in other ways.

Neuroimaging 
The 5-HT2A receptors may be imaged with PET-scanners using the fluorine-18-altanserin, MDL 100,907
or [11C]Cimbi-36 radioligands that binds to the neuroreceptor, e.g.,
one study reported a reduced binding of altanserin particularly in the hippocampus in patients with major depressive disorder.

Altanserin uptake decreases with age reflecting a loss of specific 5-HT2A receptors with age.

Other
Western blot with an affinity-purified antibody and examination of 5-HT2A receptor protein samples by electrophoresis has been described. Immunohistochemical staining of 5-HT2A receptors is also possible.

References

Further reading

External links 
 
 
 
 

Biology of attention deficit hyperactivity disorder
Biology of bipolar disorder
Serotonin receptors